Zvezdets is a village in Malko Tarnovo Municipality, in Burgas Province, in southeastern Bulgaria, close to the border with Turkey. It is situated in Strandzha Nature Park.

References

Villages in Burgas Province